Gerry McCabe (born 26 September 1956, in Hamilton) is a Scottish football player and coach.

Playing career
McCabe had a lengthy playing career that lasted almost two decades. He made over 200 league appearances for a Clydebank side that steamrollered through the divisions to the Scottish Premier Division. In 1977, he played abroad in the National Soccer League with Windsor Stars, and the following season with Toronto Italia. In 1990, he played with the Victoria Vistas. Towards the end of his playing career, he started coaching Celtic youth players.

Coaching career
After retiring as a player McCabe worked as assistant manager to Bobby Williamson at Kilmarnock. McCabe then went on to be assistant manager to Williamson at his next two managerial positions at Hibernian and Plymouth Argyle. McCabe was the caretaker manager of Hibernian when Williamson moved to Plymouth before the end of the 2003–04 season. McCabe then rejoined Williamson at Plymouth at the start of the 2004–05 season.

McCabe became manager of Dumbarton in 2006 when he replaced Paul Martin. McCabe promised a more attacking approach differing from the defensive style that Martin had employed. He also had the difficult but widely expected task of gaining promotion after only one season in the Scottish Third Division. McCabe signed former Kilmarnock Scottish Cup winner David Bagan and Stephen Dobbie on loan from St Johnstone. Dobbie scored 10 goals in 17 league games which pushed Dumbarton into a high league position. However Dobbie's loan spell ended in December 2006. Any chances of a loan extension were dashed when Dobbie signed permanently for Scottish First Division side Queen of the South. After Dobbie's departure the goals dried up and Dumbarton just fell short of a promotion play-off place and finished in fifth place. McCabe succeeded in leading Dumbarton to a Scottish Cup 3rd round tie against SPL champions Celtic which they lost 4–0. McCabe also led Dumbarton to a League Cup clash against another SPL team, Inverness Caley Thistle eventually losing the match 3–1.

In the 2007 pre-season, Dumbarton were considered one of the promotion favourites. However, after a succession of players left the club, including popular goalkeeper Stephen Grindlay, defender Chris Boyle and winger Ryan Borris, McCabe found it hard to replace them. Lack of goals was evident in the league when new signings Brian McPhee and David McFarlane failed to hit the net on a regular basis. This led to Dumbarton sitting third bottom of the league. With only 3 wins out of 11 league games, McCabe was dismissed in November 2007 after only 18 months at the Strathclyde Homes Stadium.

In January 2008, McCabe was appointed assistant manager to player-manager Jim McIntyre at Dunfermline. McCabe continued as assistant manager when Jim Jefferies was appointed Dunfermline's manager but left the club in March 2013 after it entered administration.

McCabe was appointed Queen of the South's assistant manager to McIntyre on 28 June 2013. After one season in Dumfries, McCabe moved to Dundee to become assistant to Paul Hartley.

Honours
Cork City
League of Ireland Premier Division
 1992–93: 1

Managerial statistics

References

External links 

1956 births
Arbroath F.C. players
Clyde F.C. players
Clydebank F.C. (1965) players
Cork City F.C. players
Dumbarton F.C. managers
Dumbarton F.C. players
League of Ireland players
Glentoran F.C. players
Hamilton Academical F.C. players
Hibernian F.C. non-playing staff
Hibernian F.C. players
Toronto Italia players
Living people
Canadian National Soccer League players
Scottish Football League players
Scottish footballers
Plymouth Argyle F.C. non-playing staff
Scottish football managers
Celtic F.C. non-playing staff
Kilmarnock F.C. non-playing staff
Footballers from Hamilton, South Lanarkshire
Scottish Football League managers
Dundee F.C. non-playing staff
Dunfermline Athletic F.C. non-playing staff
Association football midfielders
Victoria Vistas players